Felecia M. Bell is an American former actress best known for her roles in Days of Our Lives and General Hospital, as well as her portrayal of Jennifer Sisko in Star Trek: Deep Space Nine. She also starred in the first season of the series Night Man. After retiring from acting in 2007, Bell became a holistic nutritionist.

Life and career
Bell was born in the Valley Village neighborhood of Los Angeles, California. 

Her first role was in a 1988 episode of Hunter. Following Hunter, Bell next was seen in the TV miniseries The Great Los Angeles Earthquake as Matubu's secretary. Later on in 1990, she would land the role of Glynnis Turner on Days of Our Lives. From December 1993 to July 1996, Bell was the thirdand finalactress to play Dr. Simone Hardy on General Hospital In 1994, Bell appeared in Babyfever, her only feature film role. Bell would later go on to have roles in several different series, including three episodes of Star Trek: Deep Space Nine as Jennifer Sisko. She starred as Jessica Rodgers in the first season (1997–98) of the superhero series Night Man. Her last role was in a 2007 episode of Law & Order.

, Bell was a holistic nutritionist, operating a service called Walk In Health, in Bayonne, New Jersey.

Filmography

Film

Television

References

External links
 
 
 

Living people
African-American actresses
American television actresses
American film actresses
21st-century African-American people
21st-century African-American women
20th-century African-American people
20th-century African-American women
Year of birth missing (living people)